Singulisphaera is a moderately acidophilic and mesophilic genus of bacteria from the family of Planctomycetaceae.

See also 
 List of bacterial orders
 List of bacteria genera

References

Further reading 
 
 
 

Bacteria genera
Planctomycetota